This is a timeline of the history of chart shows on UK radio.

1950s 

 1952
 14 November – The very first UK Singles Chart is compiled, by New Musical Express.

 1953
 No events.

 1954
 No events.

 1955
 4 October – Pick of the Pops is broadcast on the BBC Light Programme for the first time

 1956
 No events.

 1957
 September – For the first time, a chart rundown is broadcast on the  when the format of running through the charts of the week, playing the top tens from various music papers plus entries to top 20s, is introduced as part of Pick of the Pops.

 1958
 29 March – The first averaged BBC Top 20 is broadcast on Pick of the Pops.

 1959
 No events.

1960s 

 1960 to 1966
 No events.

 1967
 1 October – The launch the previous day of BBC Radio 1 sees Pick of the Pops transfer to the new station.

 1968
 No events.

 1969
 No events.

1970s 
 1970
 No events.

 1971
 No events.

 1972
 24 September – Pick of the Pops is broadcast for the final time.
1 October – The first edition of a new Sunday teatime programme Solid Gold Sixty is broadcast on BBC Radio 1. Presented by Tom Browne, the programme consists of two hours featuring the Radio One playlist tracks which were not in the Top 20, followed by a one-hour Top 20 rundown from 6pm - 7pm, which was carried also on BBC Radio 2's FM transmitters.

 1973
 No events.

 1974
17 March – Solid Gold Sixty is broadcast on BBC Radio 1 for the final time. It is replaced the following week by a one-hour programme which just features the top 20.

 1975
 No events.

 1976
 No events.

 1977
 No events.

 1978
2 April – Simon Bates replaces Tom Browne as presenter of Radio 1's Sunday teatime chart rundown show.
12 November – The Sunday teatime chart show is extended from a Top 20 countdown to a Top 40 countdown.

 1979
2 September – Tony Blackburn replaces Simon Bates as host of the Sunday Top 40.

1980s 
 1980
 No events.

 1981
 No events.

 1982
10 January – Tommy Vance replaces Tony Blackburn as host of the Sunday Top 40 show.

 1983
 No events.

 1984
8 January – Simon Bates briefly returns to the Sunday teatime Top 40 programme.
30 September – 
The first edition of The Network Chart Show is broadcast. Aired on almost all of the UK's Independent Local Radio network, the programme is presented from the studios of Capital Radio by David Jensen. 
 Richard Skinner takes over as host of BBC Radio 1's chart show.

 1985
 No events.

 1986
30 March – Following Richard Skinner's departure from Radio 1, Bruno Brookes began his first stint as the host of Radio 1's chart show.

 1987
4 October – From this day, the new UK Singles Chart is released on BBC Radio 1's Sunday afternoon chart show. Previously, the programme had played songs from the chart which had been released the previous Tuesday.

 1988
 No events.

 1989
 No events.

1990s 
 1990
30 September – Mark Goodier replaces Bruno Brookes as host of BBC Radio 1's Top 40 show.

 1991
6 January – For the first time, BBC Radio 1's Sunday chart show plays all 40 tracks and the show is renamed as The Complete Top 40. This becomes possible due to an extension of the programme's duration – starting half an hour earlier at 4:30pm.

 1992
15 March – Bruno Brookes begins his second stint as host of the UK Top 40 programme. The programme is extended once again and now airs from 4pm until 7pm.
 12 September – The first broadcast of a classical music chart takes place as the newly launched Classic FM’s output includes a weekly chart show, and is broadcast on Saturday mornings and is presented by Paul Gambaccini.

 1993
18 April – The Official 1 FM Album Chart show is broadcast for the first time. Presented by Lynn Parsons, the 60-minute programme is broadcast on Sunday evenings, straight after the Top 40 singles chart. 
2 May – As part of its launch schedule, new national commercial station Virgin 1215 launches a weekly album chart show.
25 July – The last Network Chart Show goes out on Independent Local Radio. 
1 August – 'Doctor' Neil Fox introduces the first Pepsi Network Chart show, a Sunday afternoon Top 40 Countdown show for commercial radio. The top ten is based on sales with positions 11 to 40 based on a combination of single sales and airplay.

 1994
 No events.

 1995
23 April – Following Bruno Brookes's departure from Radio 1, Mark Goodier begins his second stint as presenter of the Sunday afternoon Top 40 show.

 1996
September – A rebranding of the commercial radio chart show sees it lose the Network Chart Show branding and is now called the ‘’Pepsi Chart’’.

 1997
31 August – Regular programming on the BBC's radio and television stations is abandoned to provide ongoing news coverage of the death of Diana, Princess of Wales. Consequently, for the first time, the top 40 show is not broadcast on a Sunday afternoon. The new chart is revealed in a special programme the following day.

 1998
 No events.

 1999
 No events.

2000s 
 2000
 No events.

 2001
 No events.

 2002
17 November – Mark Goodier presents the Top 40 for the final time on the 50th anniversary of the chart, and leaves the station due to falling audiences and BBC bosses considering him "too old for the job."
29 December – The last edition of thePepsi Chart Show is broadcast on commercial radio stations across the UK.

 2003
5 January –
'Doctor' Neil Fox presents the first Hit40UK, the successor of the Pepsi Chart Show.
Mark Goodier joins Classic FM to present its weekly chart show. 
9 February – Wes Butters becomes the new presenter of The Official Chart. Various presenters had hosted the show since Mark Goodier's departure last year.

 2004
6 June – After 11 years of hosting commercial radio’s national chart show, 'Doctor' Neil Fox is replaced as presenter of Hit40UK by Stephanie Hirst and Katy Hill.

2005
6 March – JK and Joel take over as presenters of The Official Chart.
23 October – Stephanie Hirst becomes the sole presenter of Hit40UK.

 2006
February – The A List launches on Heart, Real Radio and Century FM. Featuring adult contemporary music, the programme is presented by Melanie Sykes and Nick Snaith. 
23 October –  
Hit40UK  is relaunched with a new presenter Lucio Buffone. The relaunch sees Emap resuming the broadcast of the weekly programme across their Big City Network of stations, having broadcast its own chart show for the past three years.
 A new dance and urban chart, the Fresh 40, hosted by Dynamite MC, is introduced to commercial radio's dance and urban stations, such as those in the Galaxy Network and the Kiss Network.

 2007
14 October – Fearne Cotton and Reggie Yates take over as presenters of The Official Chart.
23 December – The A List ends after less than two years. The chart, which had focussed on adult contemporary music, had been aired on Heart, Real Radio and Century FM.

 2008
 Galaxy 40 launches towards the end of the 2008 and is broadcast across the Galaxy Network,

 2009
March – After less than three years on air, the final edition of Fresh 40 is aired. Also ending on this day is the short-lived Galaxy 40.
15 June – Commercial radio's chart show Hit40UK is relaunched as The Big Top 40 Show with Kat Shoob as the programme’s presenter.
27 September – Reggie Yates becomes the sole presenter of The Official Chart.

2010s
2010
10 March – The Official Chart Update is launched to give a midweek insight into the Official Singles Chart is shaping up. and is broadcast as a 30 minute mid-afternoon programme on Wednesdays.

2011
 No events.

2012
26 February – The Top Ten countdown from The Official Chart is made available in vision for the first time through the station's website.

2013
13 January – Jameela Jamil becomes the new presenter of The Official Chart.

2014
 No events.

2015
25 January – Clara Amfo takes over as presenter of The Official Chart.
5 July – The final Sunday broadcast of BBC Radio 1's The Official Chart.
10 July – The first Friday broadcast of BBC Radio 1's The Official Chart. The programme is broadcast on Fridays as part of the drive time show, hosted by Greg James. The programme's airtime is almost halved, to just 1 hour 45 minutes with only the top 10 now being played in full
.
2016
 No events.

2017
 No events.

2018
10 June - Following the relaunch of Key 103 as Hits Radio Manchester, the station drops out of the Big Top 40 to instead carry a locally-produced programme - also taken by Hits Radio UK on digital platforms and Freeview - hosted by Sarah-Jane Crawford. Other local stations in the Hits Radio network continue to carry Big Top 40 for the remainder of the year. 
15 June – Scott Mills replaces Greg James as host of The Official Chart.
30 December – Following a decision by Bauer Radio to stop broadcasting The Big Top 40 Show on their Hits Radio Network after the expiration of its contract at the end of 2018. Global, which produces the show, made the decision to withdraw the programme from syndication to the wider commercial radio network. The final show across the commercial radio network airs on 30 December 2018.

2019
6 January – The first edition of The Official Big Top 40 is aired. The programme is broadcast every Sunday from 4-7pm on Global's Capital and Heart networks and is presented by Will Manning. The withdrawal of the Big Top 40 from their stations leads Bauer Radio to roll out the UK Chart Show across the Hits Radio network, built on the Sunday afternoon show introduced on Hits Radio Manchester in 2018, whilst Wireless Group begins its own weekly show across its FM network, the Total Access Top 40, hosted by Olivia Jones.
14 July – The Official Chart: First Look launches on BBC Radio 1. Broadcast during the historic Sunday chart show slot, which is 6:00 - 7:00 pm, the show counts down the Top 20 biggest tracks from data collected on Friday and Saturday and is presented by Katie Thistleton and Cel Spellman.
21 December – The Classic FM Chart is broadcast for the final time. Classic FM had broadcasts a weekly chart show since the station's launch.

2020s
 2020
21 June – Wireless' Total Access Top 40 ceases and is replaced by Bauer's UK Chart Show on Pulse 1, Signal 1 and 96.4 The Wave, following Bauer's earlier acquisition of Wireless' local FM stations. The other stations formerly owned by Wireless drop the Total Access Top 40 as part of their transition to Greatest Hits Radio.
6 September – Vick Hope replaces Cel Spellman as co-host of The Official Chart: First Look.

 2021
February – Pirate FM and Lincs FM, having been purchased by Bauer in 2019, begin taking the UK Chart Show, replacing locally-originated programmes in the Sunday afternoon slot. The stations continue to run largely independently of the Hits Radio network at other times.

 2022
 9 September – Jack Saunders replaces Scott Mills as presenter of The Official Chart Show.

References

chart shows on UK radio
British music radio programmes